Curdworth is a village and civil parish in the North Warwickshire district of the county of Warwickshire in England. The population taken at the 2011 census was 1,115.

Location
Curdworth is 11 miles east of the centre of Birmingham.  North Warwickshire borders the Warwickshire borough of Nuneaton and Bedworth to the east, the county of Leicestershire to the north-east, Staffordshire to the north-west and Birmingham in the West Midlands to the south. The village is sandwiched between Junctions T1 of the M6 Toll and Junction 9 of the M42 motorways and the busy A4097 Kingsbury Road. Hams Hall road freight terminal (on the site of the old Hams Hall power stations) and The Belfry golf course and hotel are also close by.

History

Curdworth and Minworth both originated in the 6th or 7th centuries, being established by Anglian settlers, and are historically associated with the Arden family (William Shakespeare's maternal relations). Curdworth is probably corrupted from Crida's Worth. Worth means property of and the Mercian Crida owned land here.  Curdworth is mentioned in the Domesday Book (1086). The local Church of St Nicholas and St Peter ad Vincula is dedicated to St Nicholas and St Peter ad Vincula. Adjacent to the churchyard is the King George V Playing Fields, which was originally a raised clay and pebble base for a medieval Saxon manor complex, which was attached to the church.

This site and the moated Curdworth Hall, also a Saxon structure that was located at the top of Farthing Lane, were of great importance in the area.  Ralph Ardern inherited the manor of Curdworth  between 1382 (the death of his father, Henry de Ardern) and 1408 (the death of his mother). The remains of a moat, associated with the Ardens, are now buried under the M42. This site is thought to have been their home before they moved to Park Hall in Castle Bromwich. At the edge of the playing fields is ‘The Bomb Hole', as known by locals, which is actually a marl pit, where a fertiliser consisting of clay and calcium carbonate was extracted.

In August 1642 the first skirmish between the Roundheads and Cavaliers of the Civil War (1642–51) took place in the fields to the south of Curdworth, the Battle of Curdworth Bridge. One of the musket balls fired left a mark in a nave window of the church. Some of the casualties are supposed to be buried in the graveyard. In 1995 and 2000 Curdworth earned the title of Best Kept Village in Warwickshire, in the large village class.  The village also earned the title in 2007 of Best Kept Village in North Warwickshire, in the medium-sized village class.

References

External links

 Curdworth Primary School
 Curdworth Parish Council
 Communities in Warwickshire

Villages in Warwickshire